The Diocese of West Malaysia is an Anglican diocese which covers the entire West Malaysia. The Diocese of West Malaysia (DWM) was founded on 8 April 1970, as DWM together with Diocese of Singapore split from Diocese of Singapore and Malaya. As a result, Diocese of Singapore and Malaya was dissolved.

History
Anglicanism came to the Malay Peninsula following the establishment of the British East India Company's administered settlement on Penang island in 1786. The local magistrate, a George Caunter, was appointed a Lay Clerk/Acting Chaplain to provide spiritual ministry to the settlers. Under his ministry the first entry into the Church Register was made in 1799.

The See of Calcutta provided episcopal supervision for the chaplaincy work on Penang island and the first Anglican Church building, the Church of St. George the Martyr, was built and consecrated by the Metropolitan, Thomas Fanshaw Middleton, in 1819.

The See of Calcutta extended from India to New Zealand and was thus practically unmanageable. As a result, in 1855, a Diocese of Singapore, Labuan and Sarawak was created by Letters Patent for the better administration of these outlying areas. The new diocese became a missionary diocese of the Archdiocese of Canterbury.

In 1867 the whole of Penang island came under direct British rule, precipitated by the foreclosure of the East India Company. Consequently, the chaplaincy of the Madras Presidency in Penang ceased. Meanwhile, a major shift in mission outlook took place with the Society for the Propagation of Gospel in Foreign Parts taking an active role in procuring ‘chaplains' for the Crown in its colonies. This led to a time of great missionary activity in the new Diocese and a period of Chinese and Indian immigration.

For better administration in-line with the political changes taking place in the region, the Diocese of Singapore, Labuan and Sarawak was further reorganised into the Diocese of Singapore in 1909 with the See located in Singapore. After 120 years, the Anglican church in South-East Asia was finally positioned to take responsibility for its own mission and growth.

Church life and ministry was drastically affected by World War II and the Japanese Occupation of the peninsula between 1941 and 1945. In the midst of great hardship and war-time atrocities, Christian witness continued to thrive. Bishop Wilson, the incumbent, proved a great example of godly leadership in times of great distress. Without the benefit of its expatriate clergy who had been interred, the work of the church fell on Asian shoulders. These Asian workers operated with surprisingly responsible independence.

The War and the loss of its expatriate leadership precipitated a sense of self-determination among the local Christian community, and an urgent need for training Asian leaders for this developing part of the Anglican Church. This need led quickly to the establishment of Trinity Theological College, Singapore.

Malaya gained her independence from British rule in 1957. Following this, in 1960, the Diocese was renamed the Diocese of Singapore and Malaya to give due recognition to the political importance of Malaya. In 1963, Malaya became the Federation of Malaysia with the inclusion of Sabah and Sarawak under one central government.

Ten years after the creation of the Diocese of Singapore and Malaya, in 1971, a new and independent Diocese, the Diocese of West Malaysia, was incorporated by an Act of the Malaysian Parliament.

In 1996, the Church of the Province of South East Asia consisting of the dioceses of Sabah, Sarawak, Singapore and West Malaysia was created by the Archbishop of Canterbury, thus making the Anglican Church in the region self-governing, self-supporting, self-propagating and truly indigenous.

In 2015, a decision was made by the Diocesan Synod to further divide the diocese into three separate dioceses and in 2016, two area dioceses were created, the Area Diocese of the Northern Peninsula and the Area Diocese of the Southern Peninsula, in preparation and two suffragan bishops were licensed to oversee the area dioceses. Provisional approval of the Provincial Synod for the creation of the new dioceses by 2020 has since been obtained.

Organisation

The diocese of West Malaysia is overseen by the Bishop of West Malaysia. The area dioceses of Northern Peninsula and Southern Peninsula were created in 2016, each overseen by a suffragan bishop. The diocese is further divided into archdeaconries.

Past Diocesan Bishops

Episcopal supervision of the parishes within the Diocese of West Malaysia can be traced back to the oversight of early Anglican chaplaincies in the Malay peninsula from the metropolitan Bishop of Calcutta since 1814.

Education

Affiliated Seminaries

Diocesan Mission Schools

The Anglican Mission Schools’ Board overseas the diocesan mission schools and runs the Bishop Tan Sri Roland Koh Teaching Scholarship for Malaysian Anglicans from the Diocese of West Malaysia who desire to pursue a teaching career.

Diocesan Anglican Care Homes and Centres
Wellspring Retreat Center, Rawang
St Nicholas Home, Penang
Ray Of Hope, Ipoh
St Mark’s Cozy Home, Sungai Buloh
Beacon of Hope, Sri Manja Petaling Jaya
St. Paul’s Day Training Center & Bethel Centre Early Intervention Programme
Pushpa Nesam Children Home, Johor 
House of Delight (Community Centre), Ipoh
Rumah Damai (Senior Citizen Home), Kuala Terengganu
St Barnabas Home & Community Centre, Klang
Rumah Shalom, Gopeng

Diocesan Seminarians
Allan Selvadas
Kelvin Cheah
Samuel Das
Davina David
Emmanuel Nickson
Mah Kar Men
Paul Muthukrishnan
Aaron George Anthony
Dante Lum
Darry Lucas
Noel Nickson

References

Anglican dioceses in Asia
Christianity in Malaysia